Anna Ayşe Akasoy (born 1977) is a German orientalist and professor of Islamic intellectual history at the Graduate Center, CUNY. Akasoy works on the intellectual history of Islam, especially of al-Andalus, on Islamic philosophy as well as on Arab veterinary medicine, falconry and hunting.

Career
Akasoy studied oriental studies, history and philosophy in Frankfurt am Main, where she received her doctorate in oriental studies in 2005. She then worked as a research assistant at the Warburg Institute, London, where she worked on the project Islam and Tibet: Cultural Interactions, 8th-17th Centuries. This was followed by positions as a research assistant at the Oriental Faculty of the University of Oxford and as a research assistant at the Center for Religious Studies at the Ruhr University Bochum.

Books
Akasoy's books include:
The Arabic Version of the Nicomachean Ethics (edited with Alexander Fidora, Brill, 2005)
Das Falken- und Hundebuch des Kalifen al-Mutawakkil: Ein arabischer Traktat aus dem 9 Jahrhundert (edited and translated with Stefan Georges, Akademie, 2005)
Philosophie und Mystik in der späten Almohadenzeit, die sizilianischen Fragen des Ibn Sab'īn (Brill, 2006)
Islamic Crosspollinations: Interactions in the Medieval Middle East (edited with James E. Montgomery and Peter E. Pormann, The E. J. W. Gibb Memorial Trust, 2007)
Astro-Medicine: Astrology and Medicine, East and West (edited with Charles Burnett and Ronit Yoeli-Tlalim, Sismel–Edizioni del Galluzzo, 2008)
Islam and Tibet: Interactions along the Musk Routes (edited with Charles Burnett and Ronit Yoeli-Tlalim, Ashgate, 2010)
Rashīd al-Dīn: Agent and Mediator of Cultural Exchanges in Ilkhanid Iran (edited with Charles Burnett and Ronit Yoeli-Tlalim, The Warburg Institute, 2013)
Renaissance Averroism and Its Aftermath: Arabic Philosophy in Early Modern Europe (edited with Guido Giglioni, Springer, 2013)

References

External links 
 Academia.edu: Persönliche Seite am Hunter College
 Persönliche Seite an der Ruhr-Universität-Bochum
 Publikationsliste an der Ruhr-Universität-Bochum
 Präsentation auf der Seite der Zeitschrift Trivium

1977 births
Living people
German Arabists